Jorge Torres may refer to:

Jorge Torres (footballer) (born 1999), Peruvian soccer player
Jorge Torres (runner) (born 1980), American distance runner
Jorge Torres López (born 1954), Mexican politician
Jorge Torres Nilo (born 1988), Mexican international soccer player
Jorge Torres Palacios (c. 1960s–2014), Mexican journalist
Jorge Torres Obleas (born 1957), Bolivian politician

Jorge Torres Vallejo (1934–2007), Peruvian politician
Jorge González Torres (born 1942), Mexican politician and founder of the Ecologist Green Party of Mexico
Jorge Guillen-Torres (born 1994), American soccer player
Jorge Humberto Torres (born 1962), Mexican soccer manager and former player

Jorge Caballero (footballer) (Jorge Luis Caballero Torres, born 1994), Mexican soccer player